Tera Kya Hoga Johny is a 2008 Indian Hindi-language film directed by Sudhir Mishra, starring Karan Nath, Soha Ali Khan and Neil Nitin Mukesh. It also stars two filmmakers, Anurag Kashyap and Aditya Bhattacharya.

It was supposed to release in 2008 but was delayed, it was then set for an early 2010 release but in January 2010 it was further delayed because parts of the film were leaked on YouTube while still undergoing post-production work. Mishra (the director) filed an FIR for the police to investigate the source of the leak. Finally it released on 31 December 2010.

The film is about the city of Mumbai, and a child who sells tea on its streets. In the words of Mishra, "It's set at a time when Mumbai wants to be Shanghai." He has also stated that he wants to make a sequel to the film.

Cast
 Karan Nath as Vishal Bhargav
 Soha Ali Khan as Preeti
 Kay Kay Menon as Chiple
 Neil Nitin Mukesh as Parvez
 Saurabh Shukla as Begum
 Vijay Maurya as Chutta
 Shahana Goswami
 Makrand Deshpande
 Manoj Joshi
 Virendra Saxena
 Ashoke Pandit
 Sikandar Agarwal as Johney 
 Gagan Mudgal
 Anurag Kashyap as Kashyap (cameo)
 Aditya Bhattacharya 
 Abhay Deol Special appearance in song 'Shaher Ki Rani'

Music
"Shab Ko Roz Jaga Deta Hai" - Pankaj Awasthi
"Tore Naina Naina Le Gaye Chaina" - Ali Azmat
"Lehron Ne Kaha Kood Jara" - Pankaj Awasthi
"Mai Hu Shehar Ki Rani" - Shreya Ghoshal
"Peeche Peeche Ranjhe Ne Hajar Heeriye" - Pankaj Awasthi, Labh Janjua
"Tera Kya Hoga Johny" - Sukhwinder Singh
"Teri Parchhaiyan" - Ali Azmat

Controversy
In January 2010, the film faced controversy, when a major chunk of the film was released online in 5-6 parts over the online video sharing website, YouTube.

References

External links
 Official Website

2008 films
2000s Hindi-language films
Films scored by Abhishek Ray
Films directed by Sudhir Mishra